Aly Kaba is a Guinean politician who represents the constituency of Kouroussa, in the National Assembly (Guinea). He is the President of the Majority Rally of the Guinean People Party of former president Alpha Conde.

References

Members of the National Assembly (Guinea)
Living people
Year of birth missing (living people)